Mariano Gonzalvo Falcón (22 March 1922 – 7 April 2007), also referred to as Gonzalvo III or – especially as of late – by the Catalan rendition of his given name, Marià Gonzalvo, was a Spanish footballer who spent most of his career at FC Barcelona. Gonzalvo was regarded as one of the most talented midfielders in La Liga during the 1940s and early 1950s. On 7 December 1962 Barcelona played a testimonial game against C.A. Peñarol in his honour. He also played for both Spain and the Catalan XI. His two older brothers were also notable footballers. Juli Gonzalvo, known as Gonzalvo I played for RCD Espanyol while José Gonzalvo, known as Gonzalvo II, also played for CF Barcelona and Spain.

Career

Club career
Born in Mollet del Vallès, Barcelona, Catalonia, Gonzalvo began his career a youth with his local team in Mollet, before joining CE Europa. He then signed for FC Barcelona but initially was unable to establish himself in the first team. He spent the 1941–42 season at Real Zaragoza, playing alongside his brother Juli, and helped them gain promotion to La Liga after they finished as runners-up in the Segunda División. He returned to FC Barcelona and made his Primera División debut on 13 December 1942 in a 4–2 away defeat against Sevilla FC. Over the next thirteen seasons he was a prominent member of a very successful Barcelona team, playing 331 games and scoring 56 goals in all competitions.

Together with a team that included, among others Antoni Ramallets, Velasco, Josep Escolà, Joan Segarra, Estanislao Basora, César, Ladislao Kubala and his brother, José, he helped Barcelona win five La Liga titles and the Copa del Generalísimo three times in a row. In the 1951 Copa final he scored the third goal in 3–0 win over Real Sociedad. Gonzalvo finished his career playing one season each at UE Lleida and CD Condal. The latter team were originally the reserve team of FC Barcelona but became a separate club during the 1950s. After winning promotion from the Segunda División, they briefly played in La Liga and were joined by the veteran Gonzalvo.

International career
Between 1946 and 1954 Gonzalvo also played 16 times for Spain. He made his debut for Spain in a 1–0 defeat against Ireland on 23 June 1946 and went on to represent them at the 1950 World Cup. Between 1947 and 1955 he also played three times for the Catalan XI. His first game was a 3–1 win against Spain on 10 October 1947. On 26 January 1955 he played alongside Ladislao Kubala, Estanislao Basora and guest player Alfredo Di Stéfano in a game against Bologna at Les Corts.

Honours
FC Barcelona
 Spanish Champions (5): 1945, 1948, 1949, 1952, 1953
 Copa del Generalísimo (3): 1951, 1952, 1953
 Copa Latina: 1949
 Copa de Oro Argentina/Copa Eva Duarte (4): 1945, 1949, 1952, 1953
 Copa Martini Rossi (2): 1952, 1953

Real Zaragoza
 Segunda División runners-up: 1942

References

External links
Spain stats
Bio at www.fcbarcelonaonline.com

1922 births
2007 deaths
People from Vallès Oriental
Sportspeople from the Province of Barcelona
Association football midfielders
Footballers from Catalonia
Spanish footballers
Spain international footballers
La Liga players
CE Europa footballers
FC Barcelona players
Real Zaragoza players
UE Lleida players
1950 FIFA World Cup players
Catalonia international footballers
CD Condal players
Maria